Bayt (Arabic:  or Hebrew: , both meaning house; there are similar words in various Semitic languages), also spelled bayit, bayyit, bait, beit, beth, bet, etc., may refer to:

All pages with titles containing Bayt

Jewish religious terms
 Temple Mount, Hebrew Har ha-Bayit, "Mount of the House"
 Beth Israel (disambiguation)Beth Israel, "House of Israel"

Islamic terms
 Ahl al-Bayt, the People of the House, referring to the household of Muhammad or to all pious Muslims

Synagogues
 Beth Avraham Yoseph of Toronto, an Orthodox synagogue in Thornhill, Ontario, Canada

Place-names and derivates
In alphabetical order including the articles.

Bayit
 Bayit VeGan

Bayt

A few outstanding ones:
 Bayt al-Allah (the Kaaba)
 Bayt al-Muqaddas (Jerusalem)

Beit
 Beit Jala
 Beit Sahour
 Beit Shemesh
 Beit Hanina
 Beitin
 Betar (fortress)
 Battir

Beth
 Beth Alpha
 Beth-Horon
 Beth Shean
 Bethany (disambiguation)Bethany
 Bethel/Beth-El
 Bethesda
 Bethlehem
 Bethsaida

Institutions and organizations
First see above under "All pages with titles beginning with Bayt" and "All pages with titles containing Bayt". Here only those not spelled with "bayt".
 Bayit Lepletot, Orthodox Jewish orphanage for girls
 Bayit Leumi Israeli political organization
 Bayit Yehudi – 'The Jewish Home' political party
 Bayt al-hikmah (House of Wisdom); Umayyad library in Damascus, and Abbasid library in Baghdad
 Betar/Beitar, Jewish political organization; derived from Betar fortress

See also
 Beit or bait, lit. "house", metrical unit of poetry from Arabia through Turkey and Iran to India 
 Bet (disambiguation)
 Bet (letter), derived from the hyeroglyph for house
 Beth (disambiguation)

Semitic words and phrases